Oxford Valley is an [[Unincorporated area|unincorporated community] in Falls Township in Bucks County, Pennsylvania, United States.

 It was once small village of about 25 farm houses, a general store and post office prior to the Mall construction. It's believed the village of Oxford was settled around 1796.  

Oxford Valley is located near the intersection of U.S. Route 1 Business and Oxford Valley Road. The Oxford Valley Mall and Sesame Place amusement park are located nearby.

References

External links

Unincorporated communities in Bucks County, Pennsylvania
Unincorporated communities in Pennsylvania